Brown University is a private Ivy League research university in Providence, Rhode Island. Brown is the seventh-oldest institution of higher education in the United States, founded in 1764 as the College in the English Colony of Rhode Island and Providence Plantations. One of nine colonial colleges chartered before the American Revolution, Brown was the first college in the United States to codify in its charter that admission and instruction of students was to be equal regardless of their religious affiliation.

The university is home to the oldest applied mathematics program in the United States, the oldest engineering program in the Ivy League, and the third-oldest medical program in New England. The university was one of the early doctoral-granting U.S. institutions in the late 19th century, adding masters and doctoral studies in 1887. In 1969, Brown adopted its Open Curriculum after a period of student lobbying. The new curriculum eliminated mandatory "general education" distribution requirements, made students "the architects of their own syllabus" and allowed them to take any course for a grade of satisfactory (Pass) or no-credit (Fail) which is unrecorded on external transcripts. In 1971, Brown's coordinate women's institution, Pembroke College, was fully merged into the university.

The university comprises the College, the Graduate School, Alpert Medical School, the School of Engineering, the School of Public Health and the School of Professional Studies. Brown's international programs are organized through the Watson Institute for International and Public Affairs, and the university is academically affiliated with the Marine Biological Laboratory and the Rhode Island School of Design. In conjunction with the Rhode Island School of Design, Brown offers undergraduate and graduate dual degree programs. Undergraduate admissions are among the most selective in the country, with an overall acceptance rate of 5% for the class of 2026.

Brown's main campus is located in the College Hill neighborhood of Providence, Rhode Island. The university is surrounded by a federally listed architectural district with a dense concentration of Colonial-era buildings. Benefit Street, which runs along the western edge of the campus, contains one of the richest concentrations of 17th and 18th century architecture in the United States.

, 10 Nobel Prize winners have been affiliated with Brown as alumni, faculty, or researchers, as well as seven National Humanities Medalists and ten National Medal of Science laureates. Other notable alumni include 27 Pulitzer Prize winners, 21 billionaires, 1 U.S. Supreme Court Chief Justice, 4 U.S. Secretaries of State, 99 members of the United States Congress, 57 Rhodes Scholars, 21 MacArthur Genius Fellows, and 38 Olympic medalists.

History

Foundation and charter

In 1761, three residents of Newport, Rhode Island, drafted a petition to the colony's General Assembly:

The three petitioners were Ezra Stiles, pastor of Newport's Second Congregational Church and future president of Yale University; William Ellery, Jr., future signer of the United States Declaration of Independence; and Josias Lyndon, future governor of the colony. Stiles and Ellery later served as co-authors of the college's charter two years later. The editor of Stiles's papers observes, "This draft of a petition connects itself with other evidence of Dr. Stiles's project for a Collegiate Institution in Rhode Island, before the charter of what became Brown University."

The Philadelphia Association of Baptist Churches were also interested in establishing a college in Rhode Island—home of the mother church of their denomination. At the time, the Baptists were unrepresented among the colonial colleges; the Congregationalists had Harvard and Yale, the Presbyterians had the College of New Jersey (later Princeton), and the Episcopalians had the College of William and Mary and King's College (later Columbia) while their local University of Pennsylvania was specifically founded without direct association with any particular denomination. Isaac Backus, a historian of the New England Baptists and an inaugural trustee of Brown, wrote of the October 1762 resolution taken at Philadelphia:

James Manning arrived at Newport in July 1763 and was introduced to Stiles, who agreed to write the charter for the college. Stiles' first draft was read to the General Assembly in August 1763 and rejected by Baptist members who worried that their denomination would be underrepresented in the College Board of Fellows. A revised charter written by Stiles and Ellery was adopted by the Rhode Island General Assembly on March 3, 1764, in East Greenwich.

In September 1764, the inaugural meeting of the corporation—the college's governing body—was held in Newport's Old Colony House. Governor Stephen Hopkins was chosen chancellor, former and future governor Samuel Ward vice chancellor, John Tillinghast treasurer, and Thomas Eyres secretary. The charter stipulated that the board of trustees should be composed of 22 Baptists, five Quakers, five Episcopalians, and four Congregationalists. Of the 12 Fellows, eight should be Baptists—including the college president—"and the rest indifferently of any or all Denominations."

At the time of its creation, Brown's charter was a uniquely progressive document. Other colleges had curricular strictures against opposing doctrines, while Brown's charter asserted, "Sectarian differences of opinions, shall not make any Part of the Public and Classical Instruction." The document additionally "recognized more broadly and fundamentally than any other [university charter] the principle of denominational cooperation." The oft-repeated statement that Brown's charter alone prohibited a religious test for College membership is inaccurate; other college charters were similarly liberal in that particular.

The college was founded as Rhode Island College, at the site of the First Baptist Church in Warren, Rhode Island. Manning was sworn in as the college's first president in 1765 and remained in the role until 1791. In 1766, the college authorized the Reverend Morgan Edwards to travel to Europe to "solicit Benefactions for this Institution". During his year-and-a-half stay in the British Isles, Edwards secured funding from benefactors including Thomas Penn and Benjamin Franklin.

In 1770, the college moved from Warren to Providence. To establish a campus, John and Moses Brown purchased a four-acre lot on the crest of College Hill on behalf of the school. The majority of the property fell within the bounds of the original home lot of Chad Brown, an ancestor of the Browns and one of the original proprietors of Providence Plantations. After the college was relocated to the city, work began on constructing its first building.

A building committee, organized by the corporation, developed plans for the college's first purpose-built edifice, finalizing a design on February 9, 1770. The subsequent structure, referred to as "The College Edifice" and later as University Hall, may have been modeled on Nassau Hall, built 14 years prior at the College of New Jersey. President Manning, an active member of the building process, was educated at Princeton and might have suggested that Brown's first building resemble that of his alma mater.

Brown family

Nicholas Brown, John Brown, Joseph Brown, and Moses Brown were instrumental in moving the college to Providence, constructing its first building, and securing its endowment. Joseph became a professor of natural philosophy at the college; John served as its treasurer from 1775 to 1796; and Nicholas Sr's son Nicholas Brown Jr. succeeded his uncle as treasurer from 1796 to 1825.

On September 8, 1803, the corporation voted, "That the donation of $5000 Dollars, if made to this College within one Year from the late Commencement, shall entitle the donor to name the College." The following year, the appeal was answered by College treasurer Nicholas Brown, Jr. In a letter dated September 6, 1804, Brown committed "a donation of Five Thousand Dollars to Rhode Island College, to remain in perpetuity as a fund for the establishment of a Professorship of Oratory and Belles Letters." In recognition of the gift, the corporation on the same day voted, "That this College be called and known in all future time by the Name of Brown University." Over the years, the benefactions of Nicholas Brown, Jr., totaled nearly $160,000 and included funds for building Hope College (1821–22) and Manning Hall (1834–35).

In 1904, the John Carter Brown Library was established as an independently funded research library on Brown's campus; the library's collection was founded on that of John Carter Brown, son of Nicholas Brown, Jr.

The Brown family was involved in various business ventures in Rhode Island, and accrued wealth both directly and indirectly from the transatlantic slave trade. The family was divided on the issue of slavery. John Brown had defended slavery, while Moses and Nicholas Brown Jr. were fervent abolitionists.

In 2003, under the tenure of President Ruth Simmons, the university established a steering committee to investigate these ties of the university to slavery and recommend a strategy to address them.

American Revolution 
With British vessels patrolling Narragansett Bay in the fall of 1776, the college library was moved out of Providence for safekeeping. During the subsequent American Revolutionary War, Brown's University Hall was used to house French and other revolutionary troops led by General George Washington and the Comte de Rochambeau as they waited to commence the march of 1781 that led to the Siege of Yorktown and the Battle of the Chesapeake. This has been celebrated as marking the defeat of the British and end of the war. The building functioned as barracks and hospital from December 10, 1776, to April 20, 1780, and as a hospital for French troops from June 26, 1780, to May 27, 1782.

A number of Brown's founders and alumni played roles in the American Revolution and subsequent founding of the United States. Brown's first chancellor, Stephen Hopkins, served as a delegate to the Colonial Congress in Albany in 1754 and to the Continental Congress from 1774 to 1776. James Manning represented Rhode Island at the Congress of the Confederation, while concurrently serving as Brown's first president. Two of Brown's founders, William Ellery and Stephen Hopkins signed the Declaration of Independence.

James Mitchell Varnum, who graduated from Brown with honors in 1769, served as one of General George Washington's Continental Army brigadier generals and later as major general in command of the entire Rhode Island militia. Varnum is noted as the founder and commander of the 1st Rhode Island Regiment, widely regarded as the first Black battalion in U.S. military history. David Howell, who graduated with an A.M. in 1769, served as a delegate to the Continental Congress from 1782 to 1785.

Presidents

Nineteen individuals have served as presidents of the university since its founding in 1764. Since 2012, Christina Hull Paxson has served as president. Paxson had previously served as dean of Princeton University's School of Public and International Affairs and chair of Princeton's economics department. Paxson's immediate predecessor, Ruth Simmons, is noted as the first African American president of an Ivy League institution. Other presidents of note include academic, Vartan Gregorian; and philosopher and economist, Francis Wayland.

New Curriculum 

In 1966, the first Group Independent Study Project (GISP) at Brown was formed, involving 80 students and 15 professors. The GISP was inspired by student-initiated experimental schools, especially San Francisco State College, and sought ways to "put students at the center of their education" and "teach students how to think rather than just teaching facts".

Members of the GISP, Ira Magaziner and Elliot Maxwell published a paper of their findings titled, "Draft of a Working Paper for Education at Brown University." The paper made proposals for a new curriculum, including interdisciplinary freshman-year courses that would introduce "modes of thought," with instruction from faculty from different disciplines as well as for an end to letter grades. The following year Magaziner began organizing the student body to press for the reforms, organizing discussions and protests.

In 1968, university president Ray Heffner established a Special Committee on Curricular Philosophy. Composed of administrators, the committee was tasked with developing specific reforms and producing recommendations. A report, produced by the committee, was presented to the faculty, which voted the New Curriculum into existence on May 7, 1969. Its key features included:
Modes of Thought courses for first-year students
The introduction of interdisciplinary courses
The abandonment of "general education" distribution requirements
The Satisfactory/No Credit (S/NC) grading option
The ABC/No Credit grading system, which eliminated pluses, minuses, and D's; a grade of "No Credit" (equivalent to F's at other institutions) would not appear on external transcripts.

The Modes of Thought course was discontinued early on, but the other elements remain in place. In 2006, the reintroduction of plus/minus grading was proposed in response to concerns regarding grade inflation. The idea was rejected by the College Curriculum Council after canvassing alumni, faculty, and students, including the original authors of the Magaziner-Maxwell Report.

"Slavery and Justice" report

In 2003, then-university president Ruth Simmons launched a steering committee to research Brown's eighteenth-century ties to slavery. In October 2006, the committee released a report documenting its findings.

Titled "Slavery and Justice", the document detailed the ways in which the university benefited both directly and indirectly from the transatlantic slave trade and the labor of enslaved people. The report also included seven recommendations for how the university should address this legacy. Brown has since completed a number of these recommendations including the establishment of its Center for the Study of Slavery and Justice, the construction of its Slavery Memorial, and the funding of a $10 million permanent endowment for Providence Public Schools.

The Slavery and Justice report marked the first major effort by an American university to address its ties to slavery and prompted other institutions to undertake similar processes.

Coat of arms

Brown's coat of arms was created in 1834. The prior year, president Francis Wayland had commissioned a committee to update the school's original seal to match the name the university had adopted in 1804. Central in the coat of arms is a white escutcheon divided into four sectors by a red cross. Within each sector of the coat of arms lies an open book. Above the shield is a crest consisting of the upper half of a sun in splendor among the clouds atop a red and white torse.

Campus 

Brown is the largest institutional landowner in Providence, with properties on College Hill and in the Jewelry District. The university was built contemporaneously with the eighteenth and nineteenth century precincts surrounding it, making Brown's campus tightly integrated into Providence's urban fabric. Among the noted architects who have shaped Brown's campus are McKim, Mead & White, Philip Johnson, Rafael Viñoly, Diller Scofidio + Renfro, and Robert A. M. Stern.

Main campus 
The university's central campus sits on a  block bounded by Waterman, Prospect, George, and Thayer Streets; newer buildings extend northward, eastward, and southward. Brown's core, historic campus, constructed primary between 1770 and 1926, is defined by three greens: the Front or Quiet Green, the Middle or College Green, and the Ruth J. Simmons Quadrangle (historically known as Lincoln Field). A brick and wrought-iron fence punctuated by decorative gates and arches traces the block's perimeter. This section of campus is primarily Georgian and Richardsonian Romanesque in its architectural character.

To the south of the central campus are academic buildings and residential quadrangles, including Wriston, Keeney, and Gregorian quadrangles. Immediately to the east of the campus core sit Sciences Park and Brown's School of Engineering. North of the central campus are performing and visual arts facilities, life sciences labs, and the Pembroke Campus, which houses both dormitories and academic buildings. Facing the western edge of the central campus sit two of the Brown's seven libraries, the John Hay Library and the John D. Rockefeller Jr. Library.

The university's campus is contiguous with that of the Rhode Island School of Design, which is located immediately to Brown's west, along the slope of College Hill.

Van Wickle Gates

Built in 1901, the Van Wickle Gates are a set of wrought iron gates that stand at the western edge of Brown's campus. The larger main gate is flanked by two smaller side gates. At Convocation the central gate opens inward to admit the procession of new students; at Commencement, the gate opens outward for the procession of graduates. A Brown superstition holds that students who walk through the central gate a second time prematurely will not graduate, although walking backward is said to cancel the hex.

John Hay Library

The John Hay Library is the second oldest library on campus. Opened in 1910, the library is named for John Hay (class of 1858), private secretary to Abraham Lincoln and Secretary of State under William McKinley and Theodore Roosevelt. The construction of the building was funded in large part by Hay's friend, Andrew Carnegie, who contributed half of the $300,000 cost of construction.

The John Hay Library serves as the repository of the university's archives, rare books and manuscripts, and special collections. Noteworthy among the latter are the Anne S. K. Brown Military Collection (described as "the foremost American collection of material devoted to the history and iconography of soldiers and soldiering"), the Harris Collection of American Poetry and Plays (described as "the largest and most comprehensive collection of its kind in any research library"), the Lownes Collection of the History of Science (described as "one of the three most important private collections of books of science in America"), and the papers of H. P. Lovecraft. The Hay Library is home to one of the broadest collections of incunabula in the Americas, one of Brown's two Shakespeare First Folios, the manuscript of George Orwell's Nineteen Eighty-Four, and three books bound in human skin.

John Carter Brown Library 

Founded in 1846, the John Carter Brown Library is generally regarded as the world's leading collection of primary historical sources relating to the exploration and colonization of the Americas. While administered and funded separately from the university, the library has been owned by Brown and located on its campus since 1904.

The library contains the best preserved of the eleven surviving copies of the Bay Psalm Book—the earliest extant book printed in British North America and the most expensive printed book in the world. Other holdings include a Shakespeare First Folio and the world's largest collection of 16th century Mexican texts.

Haffenreffer Museum

The exhibition galleries of the Haffenreffer Museum of Anthropology, Brown's teaching museum, are located in Manning Hall on the campus's main green. Its one million artifacts, available for research and educational purposes, are located at its Collections Research Center in Bristol, Rhode Island. The museum's goal is to inspire creative and critical thinking about culture by fostering an interdisciplinary understanding of the material world. It provides opportunities for faculty and students to work with collections and the public, teaching through objects and programs in classrooms and exhibitions. The museum sponsors lectures and events in all areas of anthropology, and also runs an extensive program of outreach to local schools.

Annmary Brown Memorial 

The Annmary Brown Memorial was constructed from 1903 to 1907 by the politician, Civil War veteran, and book collector General Rush Hawkins, as a mausoleum for his wife, Annmary Brown, a member of the Brown family. In addition to its crypt—the final repository for Brown and Hawkins—the Memorial includes works of art from Hawkins's private collection, including paintings by Angelica Kauffman, Peter Paul Rubens, Gilbert Stuart, Giovanni Battista Tiepolo, Benjamin West, and Eastman Johnson, among others. His collection of over 450 incunabula was relocated to the John Hay Library in 1990. Today the Memorial is home to Brown's Medieval Studies and Renaissance Studies programs.

The Walk 
The Walk, a landscaped pedestrian corridor, connects the Pembroke Campus to the main campus. It runs parallel to Thayer Street and serves as a primary axis of campus, extending from Ruth Simmons Quadrangle at its southern terminus to the Meeting Street entrance to the Pembroke Campus at its northern end. The walk is bordered by departmental buildings as well as the Lindemann Performing Arts Center and Granoff Center for the Creative Arts

The corridor is home to public art including sculptures by Maya Lin and Tom Friedman.

Pembroke campus

The Women's College in Brown University, known as Pembroke College, was founded in October 1891. Upon its 1971 merger with the College of Brown University, Pembroke's campus was absorbed into the larger Brown campus. The Pembroke campus is bordered by Meeting, Brown, Bowen, and Thayer Streets and sits three blocks north of Brown's central campus. The campus is dominated by brick architecture, largely of the Georgian and Victorian styles. The west side of the quadrangle comprises Pembroke Hall (1897), Smith-Buonanno Hall (1907), and Metcalf Hall (1919), while the east side comprises Alumnae Hall (1927) and Miller Hall (1910). The quadrangle culminates on the north with Andrews Hall (1947).

East Campus, centered on Hope and Charlesfield streets, originally served as the campus of Bryant University. In 1969, as Bryant was preparing to relocate to Smithfield, Rhode Island, Brown purchased their Providence campus for $5 million. In 1971, Brown renamed the area East Campus. Today, the area is largely used for dormitories.

Thayer Street runs through Brown's main campus. As commercial corridor frequented by students, Thayer is comparable to Harvard Square or Berkeley's Telegraph Avenue. Wickenden Street, in the adjacent Fox Point neighborhood, is another commercial street similarly popular among students.

Built in 1925, Brown Stadium—the home of the school's football team—is located approximately a mile and a half northeast of the university's central campus. Marston Boathouse, the home of Brown's crew teams, lies on the Seekonk River, to the southeast of campus. Brown's sailing teams are based out of the Ted Turner Sailing Pavilion at the Edgewood Yacht Club in adjacent Cranston.

Since 2011, Brown's Warren Alpert Medical School has been located in Providence's historic Jewelry District, near the medical campus of Brown's teaching hospitals, Rhode Island Hospital and the Women and Infants Hospital of Rhode Island. Other university facilities, including molecular medicine labs and administrative offices, are likewise located in the area.

Brown's School of Public Health occupies a landmark modernist building along the Providence River. Other Brown properties include the  Mount Hope Grant in Bristol, Rhode Island, an important Native American site noted as a location of King Philip's War. Brown's Haffenreffer Museum of Anthropology Collection Research Center, particularly strong in Native American items, is located in the Mount Hope Grant.

Sustainability 
Brown has committed to "minimize its energy use, reduce negative environmental impacts and promote environmental stewardship." Since 2010, the university has required all new buildings meet LEED silver standards. Between 2007 and 2018, Brown reduced its greenhouse emissions by 27 percent; the majority of this reduction is attributable to the university's Thermal Efficiency Project which converted its central heating plant from a steam-powered system to a hot water-powered system.

In 2020, Brown announced it had sold 90 percent of its fossil fuel investments as part of a broader divestment from direct investments and managed funds that focus on fossil fuels. In 2021, the university adopted the goal of reducing quantifiable campus emissions by 75 percent by 2025 and achieving carbon neutrality by 2040.

According to the A. W. Kuchler U.S. potential natural vegetation types, Brown would have a dominant vegetation type of Appalachian Oak (104) with a dominant vegetation form of Eastern Hardwood Forest (25).

Academics

The College

Founded in 1764, The College is Brown's oldest school. About 7,200 undergraduate students are enrolled in the college , and 81 concentrations are offered. For the graduating class of 2020 the most popular concentrations were Computer Science, Economics, Biology, History, Applied Mathematics, International Relations, and Political Science. A quarter of Brown undergraduates complete more than one concentration before graduating. If the existing programs do not align with their intended curricular interests, undergraduates may design and pursue independent concentrations.

Around 35 percent  of undergraduates pursue graduate or professional study immediately, 60 percent within 5 years, and 80 percent within 10 years. For the Class of 2009, 56 percent of all undergraduate alumni have since earned graduate degrees. Among undergraduate alumni who go on to receive graduate degrees, the most common degrees earned are J.D. (16%), M.D. (14%), M.A. (14%), M.Sc. (14%), and Ph.D. (11%). The most common institutions from which undergraduate alumni earn graduate degrees are Brown University, Columbia University, and Harvard University.

The highest fields of employment for undergraduate alumni ten years after graduation are education and higher education (15%), medicine (9%), business and finance (9%), law (8%), and computing and technology (7%).

Brown and RISD

Since its 1893 relocation to College Hill, Rhode Island School of Design (RISD) has bordered Brown to its west. Since 1900, Brown and RISD students have been able to cross-register at the two institutions, with Brown students permitted to take as many as four courses at RISD to count towards their Brown degree. The two institutions partner to provide various student-life services and the two student bodies compose a synergy in the College Hill cultural scene.

Dual Degree Program 
After several years of discussion between the two institutions and several students pursuing dual degrees unofficially, Brown and RISD formally established a five-year dual degree program in 2007, with the first class matriculating in the fall of 2008. The Brown|RISD Dual Degree Program, among the most selective in the country, offered admission to 20 of the 725 applicants for the class entering in autumn 2020, for an acceptance rate of 2.7%. The program combines the complementary strengths of the two institutions, integrating studio art and design at RISD with Brown's academic offerings. Students are admitted to the Dual Degree Program for a course lasting five years and culminating in both the Bachelor of Arts (A.B.) or Bachelor of Science (Sc.B.) degree from Brown and the Bachelor of Fine Arts (B.F.A.) degree from RISD. Prospective students must apply to the two schools separately and be accepted by separate admissions committees. Their application must then be approved by a third Brown|RISD joint committee.

Admitted students spend the first year in residence at RISD completing its first-year Experimental and Foundation Studies curriculum while taking up to three Brown classes. Students spend their second year in residence at Brown, during which students take mainly Brown courses while starting on their RISD major requirements. In the third, fourth, and fifth years, students can elect to live at either school or off-campus, and course distribution is determined by the requirements of each student's unique combination of Brown concentration and RISD major. Program participants are noted for their creative and original approach to cross-disciplinary opportunities, combining, for example, industrial design with engineering, or anatomical illustration with human biology, or philosophy with sculpture, or architecture with urban studies. An annual "BRDD Exhibition" is a well-publicized and heavily attended event, drawing interest and attendees from the broader world of industry, design, the media, and the fine arts.

MADE Program 
In 2020, the two schools announced the establishment of a new joint Master of Arts in design engineering program. Abbreviated as MADE, the program intends to combine RISD's programs in industrial design with Brown's programs in engineering. The program is administered through Brown's School of Engineering and RISD's Architecture and Design Division.

Theatre and playwriting

Brown's theatre and playwriting programs are among the best-regarded in the country. Six Brown graduates have received the Pulitzer Prize for Drama; Alfred Uhry '58, Lynn Nottage '86, Ayad Akhtar '93, Nilo Cruz '94, Quiara Alegría Hudes '04, and Jackie Sibblies Drury MFA '04. In American Theater magazine's 2009 ranking of the most-produced American plays, Brown graduates occupied four of the top five places—Peter Nachtrieb '97, Rachel Sheinkin '89, Sarah Ruhl '97, and Stephen Karam '02.

The undergraduate concentration encompasses programs in theatre history, performance theory, playwriting, dramaturgy, acting, directing, dance, speech, and technical production. Applications for doctoral and master's degree programs are made through the University Graduate School. Master's degrees in acting and directing are pursued in conjunction with the Brown/Trinity Rep MFA program, which partners with the Trinity Repertory Company, a local regional theatre.

Writing programs
Writing at Brown—fiction, non-fiction, poetry, playwriting, screenwriting, electronic writing, mixed media, and the undergraduate writing proficiency requirement—is catered for by various centers and degree programs, and a faculty that has long included nationally and internationally known authors. The undergraduate concentration in literary arts offers courses in fiction, poetry, screenwriting, literary hypermedia, and translation. Graduate programs include the fiction and poetry MFA writing programs in the literary arts department, and the MFA playwriting program in the theatre arts and performance studies department. The non-fiction writing program is offered in the English department. Screenwriting and cinema narrativity courses are offered in the departments of literary arts and modern culture and media. The undergraduate writing proficiency requirement is supported by the Writing Center.

Author prizewinners
Alumni authors take their degrees across the spectrum of degree concentrations, but a gauge of the strength of writing at Brown is the number of major national writing prizes won. To note only winners since the year 2000: Pulitzer Prize for Fiction-winners Jeffrey Eugenides '82 (2003), Marilynne Robinson '66 (2005), and Andrew Sean Greer '92 (2018); British Orange Prize-winners Marilynne Robinson '66 (2009) and Madeline Miller '00 (2012); Pulitzer Prize for Drama-winners Nilo Cruz '94 (2003), Lynn Nottage '86 (twice, 2009, 2017), Quiara Alegría Hudes '04 (2012), Ayad Akhtar '93 (2013), and Jackie Sibblies Drury MFA '04 (2019); Pulitzer Prize for Biography-winners David Kertzer '69 (2015) and Benjamin Moser '98 (2020); Pulitzer Prize for Journalism-winners James Risen '77 (2006), Gareth Cook '91 (2005), Tony Horwitz '80 (1995), Usha Lee McFarling '89 (2007), David Rohde '90 (1996), Kathryn Schulz '96 (2016), and Alissa J. Rubin '80 (2016); Pulitzer Prize for General Nonfiction-winner James Forman Jr. '88 (2018); Pulitzer Prize for History-winner Marcia Chatelain PhD '08 (2021); Pulitzer Prize for Criticism-winner Salamishah Tillet MAT '97 (2022); and Pulitzer Prize for Poetry-winner Peter Balakian PhD '80 (2016)

Computer science

Brown began offering computer science courses through the departments of Economics and Applied Mathematics in 1956 when it acquired an IBM machine. Brown added an IBM 650 in January 1958, the only one of its type between Hartford and Boston. In 1960, Brown opened its first dedicated computer building. The facility, designed by Philip Johnson, received an IBM 7070 computer the following year. Brown granted computer sciences full Departmental status in 1979. In 2009, IBM and Brown announced the installation of a supercomputer (by teraflops standards), the most powerful in the southeastern New England region.

In the 1960s, Andries van Dam along with Ted Nelson, and Bob Wallace invented The Hypertext Editing Systems, HES and FRESS while at Brown. Nelson coined the word hypertext while Van Dam's students helped originate XML, XSLT, and related Web standards. Among the school's computer science alumni are principal architect of the Classic Mac OS, Andy Hertzfeld; principal architect of the Intel 80386 and Intel 80486 microprocessors, John Crawford; former CEO of Apple, John Sculley; and digital effects programmer Masi Oka. Other alumni include former CS department head at MIT, John Guttag, Workday founder, Aneel Bhusri, MongoDB founder Eliot Horowitz, Figma founders Dylan Field and Evan Wallace; and OpenSea founder Devin Finzer.

The character "Andy" in the animated film Toy Story is purportedly an homage to professor Van Dam from his students employed at Pixar.

Between 2012 and 2018, the number of concentrators in CS tripled. In 2017, computer science overtook economics as the school's most popular undergraduate concentration.

Applied mathematics 
Brown's program in applied mathematics was established in 1941 making it the oldest such program the United States. The division is highly ranked and regarded nationally and internationally. Among the 67 recipients of the Timoshenko Medal, 22 have been affiliated with Brown's applied mathematics division as faculty, researchers, or students.

The Joukowsky Institute for Archaeology and the Ancient World 

Established in 2004, the Joukowsky Institute for Archaeology and the Ancient World is Brown's interdisciplinary research center for archeology and ancient studies. The institute pursues fieldwork, excavations, regional surveys, and academic study of the archaeology and art of the ancient Mediterranean, Egypt, and Western Asia from the Levant to the Caucasus. The institute has a very active fieldwork profile, with faculty-led excavations and regional surveys presently in Petra (Jordan), Abydos (Egypt), Turkey, Sudan, Italy, Mexico, Guatemala, Montserrat, and Providence.

The Joukowsky Institute's faculty includes cross-appointments from the departments of Egyptology, Assyriology, Classics, Anthropology, and History of Art and Architecture. Faculty research and publication areas include Greek and Roman art and architecture, landscape archaeology, urban and religious architecture of the Levant, Roman provincial studies, the Aegean Bronze Age, and the archaeology of the Caucasus. The institute offers visiting teaching appointments and postdoctoral fellowships which have, in recent years, included Near Eastern Archaeology and Art, Classical Archaeology and Art, Islamic Archaeology and Art, and Archaeology and Media Studies.

Egyptology and Assyriology

Facing the Joukowsky Institute, across the Front Green, is the Department of Egyptology and Assyriology, formed in 2006 by the merger of Brown's departments of Egyptology and History of Mathematics. It is one of only a handful of such departments in the United States. The curricular focus is on three principal areas: Egyptology, Assyriology, and the history of the ancient exact sciences (astronomy, astrology, and mathematics). Many courses in the department are open to all Brown undergraduates without prerequisite, and include archaeology, languages, history, and Egyptian and Mesopotamian religions, literature, and science. Students concentrating in the department choose a track of either Egyptology or Assyriology. Graduate level study comprises three tracks to the doctoral degree: Egyptology, Assyriology, or the History of the Exact Sciences in Antiquity.

The Watson Institute for International and Public Affairs 

The Watson Institute for International and Public Affairs, Brown's center for the study of global issues and public affairs, is one of the leading institutes of its type in the country. The institute occupies facilities designed by Uruguayan architect Rafael Viñoly and Japanese architect Toshiko Mori. The institute was initially endowed by Thomas Watson, Jr. (Class of 1937), former Ambassador to the Soviet Union and longtime president of IBM.

Institute faculty and faculty emeritus include Italian prime minister and European Commission president Romano Prodi, Brazilian president Fernando Henrique Cardoso, Chilean president Ricardo Lagos Escobar, Mexican novelist and statesman Carlos Fuentes, Brazilian statesman and United Nations commission head Paulo Sérgio Pinheiro, Indian foreign minister and ambassador to the United States Nirupama Rao, American diplomat and Dayton Peace Accords author Richard Holbrooke (Class of 1962), and Sergei Khrushchev, editor of the papers of his father Nikita Khrushchev, leader of the Soviet Union.

The institute's curricular interest is organized into the principal themes of development, security, and governance—with further focuses on globalization, economic uncertainty, security threats, environmental degradation, and poverty. Six Brown undergraduate concentrations are hosted by the Watson Institute: Development Studies, International and Public Affairs, International Relations, Latin American and Caribbean Studies, Middle East Studies, Public Policy, and South Asian Studies. Graduate programs offered at the Watson Institute include the Graduate Program in Development (Ph.D.) and the Master of Public Affairs (M.P.A) Program. The institute also offers postdoctoral, professional development and global outreach programming. In support of these programs, the institute houses various centers, including the Brazil Initiative, Brown-India Initiative, China Initiative, Middle East Studies center, The Center for Latin American and Caribbean Studies (CLACS) and the Taubman Center for Public Policy. In recent years, the most internationally cited product of the Watson Institute has been its Costs of War Project, first released in 2011 and continuously updated since. The project comprises a team of economists, anthropologists, political scientists, legal experts, and physicians, and seeks to calculate the economic costs, human casualties, and impact on civil liberties of the wars in Iraq, Afghanistan, and Pakistan since 2001.

The School of Engineering

Established in 1847, Brown's engineering program is the oldest in the Ivy League and the third oldest civilian engineering program in the country. In 1916, Brown's departments of electrical, mechanical, and civil engineering were merged into a single Division of Engineering. In 2010 the division was elevated to a School of Engineering.

Engineering at Brown is especially interdisciplinary. The school is organized without the traditional departments or boundaries found at most schools, and follows a model of connectivity between disciplines—including biology, medicine, physics, chemistry, computer science, the humanities and the social sciences. The school practices an innovative clustering of faculties in which engineers team with non-engineers to bring a convergence of ideas.

Student teams have launched two CubeSats with the support of the school of Engineering. Brown Space Engineering developed EQUiSat a 1U satellite, and another interdisciplinary team developed SBUDNIC a 3U satellite.

IE Brown Executive MBA Dual Degree Program
Since 2009, Brown has developed an Executive MBA program in conjunction with one of the leading Business Schools in Europe; IE Business School in Madrid. This relationship has since strengthened resulting in both institutions offering a dual degree program. In this partnership, Brown provides its traditional coursework while IE provides most of the business-related subjects making a differentiated alternative program to other Ivy League's EMBAs. The cohort typically consists of 25–30 EMBA candidates from some 20 countries. Classes are held in Providence, Madrid, Cape Town and Online.

The Pembroke Center

The Pembroke Center for Teaching and Research on Women was established at Brown in 1981 by Joan Wallach Scott as an interdisciplinary research center on gender. The center is named for Pembroke College, Brown's former women's college, and is affiliated with Brown's Sarah Doyle Women's Center. The Pembroke Center supports Brown's undergraduate concentration in Gender and Sexuality Studies, post-doctoral research fellowships, the annual Pembroke Seminar, and other academic programs. It also manages various collections, archives, and resources, including the Elizabeth Weed Feminist Theory Papers and the Christine Dunlap Farnham Archive.

The Graduate School

Brown introduced graduate courses in the 1870s and granted its first advanced degrees in 1888. The university established a Graduate Department in 1903 and a full Graduate School in 1927.

With an enrollment of approximately 2,600 students, the school currently offers 33 and 51 master's and doctoral programs, respectively. The school additionally offers a number of fifth-year master's programs. Overall, admission to the Graduate School is most competitive with an acceptance rate averaging at approximately 9 percent in recent years.

Carney Institute for Brain Science 

The Robert J. & Nancy D. Carney Institute for Brain Science is Brown's cross-departmental neuroscience research institute. The institute's core focus areas include brain-computer interfaces and computational neuroscience; additional areas of focus include research into mechanisms of cell death with the interest of developing therapies for neurodegenerative diseases.

The Carney Institute was founded by John Donoghue in 2009 as the Brown Institute for Brain Science and renamed in 2018 in recognition of a $100 million gift. The donation, one of the largest in the university's history, established the institute as one of the best-endowed university neuroscience programs in the country.

Alpert Medical School

Established in 1811, Brown's Alpert Medical School is the fourth oldest medical school in the Ivy League.

In 1827, medical instruction was suspended by President Francis Wayland after the program's faculty declined to follow a new policy requiring students to live on campus. The program was reorganized in 1972; the first M.D. degrees from the new Program in Medicine were awarded to a graduating class of 58 students in 1975. In 1991, the school was officially renamed the Brown University School of Medicine, then renamed once more to Brown Medical School in October 2000. In January 2007, entrepreneur and philanthropist Warren Alpert donated $100 million to the school. In recognition of the gift the school's name was changed to the Warren Alpert Medical School of Brown University.

In 2020, U.S. News & World Report ranked Brown's medical school the 9th most selective in the country, with an acceptance rate of 2.8%. U.S. News ranks the school 38th for research and 35th for primary care.

Brown's medical school is known especially for its eight-year Program in Liberal Medical Education (PLME), an eight-year combined baccalaureate-M.D. medical program. Inaugurated in 1984, the program is one of the most selective and renowned programs of its type in the country, offering admission to only of 2% of applicants in 2021.

Since 1976, the Early Identification Program (EIP) has encouraged Rhode Island residents to pursue careers in medicine by recruiting sophomores from Providence College, Rhode Island College, the University of Rhode Island, and Tougaloo College. In 2004, the school once again began to accept applications from premedical students at other colleges and universities via AMCAS like most other medical schools. The medical school also offers M.D./PhD, M.D./M.P.H. and M.D./M.P.P. dual degree programs.

School of Public Health 

Brown's School of Public Health grew out of the Alpert Medical School's Department of Community Health and was officially founded in 2013 as an independent school. The school issues undergraduate (A.B., Sc.B.), graduate (M.P.H., Sc.M., A.M.), doctoral (Ph.D.), and dual-degrees (M.P.H./M.P.A., M.D./M.P.H.).

Online programs
The Brown University School of Professional Studies currently offers blended learning Executive master's degrees in Healthcare Leadership, Cyber Security, and Science and Technology Leadership. The master's degrees are designed to help students who have a job and life outside of academia to progress in their respective fields. The students meet in Providence every 6–7 weeks for a week seminar each trimester.

The university has also invested in MOOC development starting in 2013, when two courses, Archeology's Dirty Little Secrets and The Fiction of Relationship, both of which received thousands of students. However, after a year of courses, the university broke its contract with Coursera and revamped its online persona and MOOC development department. By 2017, the university released new courses on edx, two of which were The Ethics of Memory and Artful Medicine: Art's Power to Enrich Patient Care. In January 2018, Brown published its first "game-ified" course called Fantastic Places, Unhuman Humans: Exploring Humanity Through Literature, which featured out of platform games to help learners understand materials, as well as a story-line that immerses users into a fictional world to help characters along their journey.

Admissions and financial aid

Undergraduate 
Undergraduate admission to Brown University is considered "most selective" by U.S. News & World Report. For the undergraduate class of 2026, Brown received 50,649 applications—the largest applicant pool in the university's history and a 9% increase from the prior year. Of these applicants, 2,560 were admitted for an acceptance rate of 5.0%, the lowest in the university's history.

In 2021, the university reported a yield rate of 69%. For the academic year 2019–20 the university received 2,030 transfer applications, of which 5.8% were accepted.

Brown's admissions policy is stipulated need-blind for all domestic first-year applicants. In 2017, Brown announced that loans would be eliminated from all undergraduate financial aid awards starting in 2018–2019, as part of a new $30 million campaign called the Brown Promise. In 2016–17, the university awarded need-based scholarships worth $120.5 million. The average need-based award for the class of 2020 was $47,940.

Graduate 
In 2017, the Graduate School accepted 11% of 9,215 applicants. In 2021, Brown received a record 948 applications for roughly 90 spots in its Master of Public Health Degree.

In 2020, U.S. News ranked Brown's Warren Alpert Medical School the 9th most selective in the country, with an acceptance rate of 2.8 percent.

Rankings

Brown University is accredited by the New England Commission of Higher Education. For their 2021 rankings, The Wall Street Journal/Times Higher Education ranked Brown 5th in the "Best Colleges 2021" edition.

The Forbes magazine annual ranking of "America's Top Colleges 2022"—which ranked 600 research universities, liberal arts colleges and service academies—ranked Brown 19th overall and 18th among universities.

U.S. News & World Report ranked Brown 13th among national universities in its 2022 edition. The 2022 edition also ranked Brown 2nd for undergraduate teaching, 25th in Most Innovative Schools, and 14th in Best Value Schools.

Washington Monthly ranked Brown 40th in 2022 among 442 national universities in the U.S. based on its contribution to the public good, as measured by social mobility, research, and promoting public service.

In 2022, U.S. News & World Report ranks Brown 129th globally.

In 2014, Forbes magazine ranked Brown 7th on its list of "America's Most Entrepreneurial Universities." The Forbes analysis looked at the ratio of "alumni and students who have identified themselves as founders and business owners on LinkedIn" and the total number of alumni and students. LinkedIn particularized the Forbes rankings, placing Brown third (between MIT and Princeton) among "Best Undergraduate Universities for Software Developers at Startups." LinkedIn's methodology involved a career-path examination of "millions of alumni profiles" in its membership database.

In 2016, 2017, 2018, and 2021 the university produced the most Fulbright recipients of any university in the nation. Brown has also produced the 7th most Rhodes Scholars of all colleges and universities in the United States.

Research
Brown is a member of the Association of American Universities since 1933 and is classified among "R1: Doctoral Universities – Very High Research Activity". In FY 2017, Brown spent $212.3 million on research and was ranked 103rd in the United States by total R&D expenditure by National Science Foundation. In 2021 Brown's School of Public Health received the 4th most funding in NIH awards among schools of public health in the U.S.

Student life

Campus safety
In 2014, Brown tied with the University of Connecticut for the highest number of reported rapes in the nation, with its "total of reports of rape" on their main campus standing at 43.

Spring weekend

Established in 1950, Spring Weekend is an annual spring music festival for students. Historical performers at the festival have included Ella Fitzgerald, Dizzy Gillespie, Ray Charles, Bob Dylan, Janis Joplin, Bruce Springsteen, and U2. More recent headliners include Kendrick Lamar, Young Thug, Daniel Caesar, Anderson .Paak, Mitski, Aminé, and Mac DeMarco. Since 1960, Spring Weekend has been organized by the student-run Brown Concert Agency.

Residential and Greek societies 
Approximately 12 percent of Brown students participate in Greek Life. The university recognizes thirteen active Greek organizations: six fraternities (Beta Omega Chi, Beta Rho Pi, Delta Tau, Delta Phi, Kappa Alpha Psi, and Theta Alpha), five sororities (Alpha Chi Omega, Delta Sigma Theta, Delta Gamma, Kappa Delta, and Kappa Alpha Theta,), one co-ed house (Zeta Delta Xi), and one co-ed literary society (Alpha Delta Phi). Other Greek-lettered organizations that have been historically active at Brown University include Alpha Kappa Alpha, Alpha Phi Alpha, and Lambda Upsilon Lambda.

Since the early 1950s, all Greek organizations on campus have been located in Wriston Quadrangle. The organizations are overseen by the Greek Council.

An alternative to Greek-letter organizations are Brown's program houses, which are organized by themes. As with Greek houses, the residents of program houses select their new members, usually at the start of the spring semester. Examples of program houses are St. Anthony Hall (located in King House), Buxton International House, the Machado French/Hispanic/Latinx House, Technology House, Harambee (African culture) House, Social Action House and Interfaith House.

All students not in program housing enter a lottery for general housing. Students form groups and are assigned time slots during which they can pick among the remaining housing options.

Societies and clubs 

The earliest societies at Brown were devoted to oration and debate. The Pronouncing Society is mentioned in the diary of Solomon Drowne, class of 1773, who was voted its president in 1771. The organization seems to have disappeared during the American Revolutionary War. Subsequent societies include the Misokosmian Society (est. 1798 and renamed the Philermenian Society), the Philandrian Society (est. 1799), the United Brothers (1806), the Philophysian Society (1818), and the Franklin Society (1824). Societies served social as well as academic purposes, with many supporting literary debate and amassing large libraries. Older societies generally aligned with Federalists while younger societies generally leaned Republican.

Societies remained popular into the 1860s, after which they were largely replaced by fraternities.

The Cammarian Club was at first a semi-secret society which "tapped" 15 seniors each year. In 1915, self-perpetuating membership gave way to popular election by the student body, and thenceforward the club served as the de facto undergraduate student government. The organization was dissolved in 1971, and ultimately succeeded by a formal student government.

Societas Domi Pacificae, known colloquially as "Pacifica House," is a present-day, self-described secret society. It purports a continuous line of descent from the Franklin Society of 1824, citing a supposed intermediary "Franklin Society" traceable in the nineteenth century.

Student organizations 

There are over 300 registered student organizations on campus with diverse interests. The Student Activities Fair, during the orientation program, provides first-year students the opportunity to become acquainted with the wide range of organizations. A sample of organizations includes:

Brown University Undergraduate Council of Students
The Brown Daily Herald
Brown Debating Union
The Brown Derbies
Brown International Organization
Brown Journal of World Affairs
The Brown Jug
The Brown Noser
Brown Opera Productions
Brown Space Engineering
Brown Political Review
The Brown Spectator
BSR
Brown University Band
Brown University Orchestra
Chinese Students and Scholars Association
The College Hill Independent
Critical Review
Ivy Film Festival
Jabberwocks
Production Workshop
Strait Talk
Starla and Sons
Students for Sensible Drug Policy
WBRU
What's on Tap?

Resource centers 

Brown has several resource centers on campus. The centers often act as sources of support as well as safe spaces for students to explore certain aspects of their identity. Additionally, the centers often provide physical spaces for students to study and have meetings. Although most centers are identity-focused, some provide academic support as well.

The Brown Center for Students of Color (BCSC) is a space that provides support for students of color. Established in 1972 at the demand of student protests, the BCSC encourages students to engage in critical dialogue, develop leadership skills, and promote social justice. The center houses various programs for students to share their knowledge and engage in discussion. Programs include the Third World Transition Program, the Minority Peer Counselor Program, the Heritage Series, and other student-led initiatives. Additionally, the BCSC hopes to foster community among the students it serves by providing spaces for students to meet and study.

The Sarah Doyle Women's Center aims to provide a space for members of the Brown community to examine and explore issues surrounding gender. The center was named after one of the first women to attend Brown, Sarah Doyle. The center emphasizes intersectionality in its conversations on gender, encouraging people to see gender as present and relevant in various aspects of life. The center hosts programs and workshops in order to facilitate dialogue and provide resources for students, faculty, and staff.

Other centers include the LGBTQ Center, the Undocumented, First-Generation College and Low-Income Student (U-FLi) Center, and the Curricular Resource Center.

Activism

1968 Black Student Walkout
On December 5, 1968, several Black women from Pembroke College initiated a walkout in protest an atmosphere at the colleges described by Black students as a "stifling, frustrating, [and] degrading place for Black students" after feeling the colleges were non-responsive to their concerns. In total, 65 Black students participated in the walk out. Their principal demand was to increase Black student enrollment to 11% of the student populace, in an attempt to match that of the proportion in the US. This ultimately resulted in a 300% increase in Black enrollment the following year, but some demands have yet to be met.

Divestment from South Africa
In the mid-1980's under student pressure, the University divested from certain companies involved in South Africa. Some students were still unsatisfied with partial divestment and began a fast in Manning Chapel and the University disenrolled them. In April 1987, "dozens" of students interrupted a University corporation meeting, leading to 20 to be put on probation.

Athletics

Brown is a member of the Ivy League athletic conference, which is categorized as a Division I (top level) conference of the National Collegiate Athletic Association (NCAA).

The Brown Bears has one of the largest university sports programs in the United States, sponsoring 32 varsity intercollegiate teams. Brown's athletic program is one of the U.S. News & World Report top 20—the "College Sports Honor Roll"—based on breadth of program and athletes' graduation rates. 
Brown's newest varsity team is women's rugby, promoted from club-sport status in 2014. Brown women's rowing has won 7 national titles between 1999 and 2011. Brown men's rowing perennially finishes in the top 5 in the nation, most recently winning silver, bronze, and silver in the national championship races of 2012, 2013, and 2014. The men's and women's crews have also won championship trophies at the Henley Royal Regatta and the Henley Women's Regatta. Brown's men's soccer is consistently ranked in the top 20 and has won 18 Ivy League titles overall; recent soccer graduates play professionally in Major League Soccer and overseas.

Brown football, under its most successful coach historically, Phil Estes, won Ivy League championships in 1999, 2005, and 2008. high-profile alumni of the football program include former Houston Texans head coach Bill O'Brien; former Penn State football coach Joe Paterno, Heisman Trophy namesake John W. Heisman, and Pollard Award namesake Fritz Pollard.

Brown women's gymnastics won the Ivy League tournament in 2013 and 2014. The Brown women's sailing team has won 5 national championships, most recently in 2019 while the coed sailing team won 2 national championships in 1942 and 1948. Both teams are consistency ranked in the top 10 in the nation.

The first intercollegiate ice hockey game in America was played between Brown and Harvard on January 19, 1898. The first university rowing regatta larger than a dual-meet was held between Brown, Harvard, and Yale at Lake Quinsigamond in Massachusetts on July 26, 1859.

Brown also supports competitive intercollegiate club sports, including ultimate frisbee. The men's ultimate team, Brownian Motion, has won three national championships, in 2000, 2005 and 2019.

Notable people

Alumni 

Alumni in politics include U.S. Secretary of State John Hay (1852), U.S. Secretary of State and U.S. Attorney General Richard Olney (1856), Chief Justice of the United States and U.S. Secretary of State Charles Evans Hughes (1881), Louisiana Governor Bobby Jindal '92, U.S. Senator Maggie Hassan '80 of New Hampshire, Delaware Governor Jack Markell '82, Rhode Island Representative David Cicilline '83, Minnesota Representative Dean Phillips '91, 2020 Presidential candidate and entrepreneur Andrew Yang '96, and DNC Chair Tom Perez '83.

Prominent alumni in business and finance include philanthropist John D. Rockefeller Jr. (1897), managing director of McKinsey & Company and "father of modern management consulting" Marvin Bower '25, former Chair of the Federal Reserve and current U.S. Secretary of the Treasury Janet Yellen '67, World Bank President Jim Yong Kim '82, Bank of America CEO Brian Moynihan '81, CNN founder Ted Turner '60, IBM chairman and CEO Thomas Watson, Jr. '37, co-founder of Starwood Capital Group Barry Sternlicht '82, Apple Inc. CEO John Sculley '61, Blackberry Ltd. CEO John S. Chen '78, Facebook CFO David Ebersman '91, and Uber CEO Dara Khosrowshahi '91. Companies founded by Brown alumni include CNN,The Wall Street Journal, Searchlight Pictures, Netgear, W Hotels, Workday, Warby Parker, Casper, Figma, ZipRecruiter, and Cards Against Humanity.

Alumni in the arts and media include actors Emma Watson '14, John Krasinski '01, Daveed Diggs '04, Julie Bowen '91, Tracee Ellis Ross '94, and Jessica Capshaw '98; NPR program host Ira Glass '82; singer-composer Mary Chapin Carpenter '81; humorist and Marx Brothers screenwriter S.J. Perelman '25; novelists Nathanael West '24, Jeffrey Eugenides '83, Edwidge Danticat (MFA '93), and Marilynne Robinson '66; and composer and synthesizer pioneer Wendy Carlos '62, journalist James Risen '77; political pundit Mara Liasson; MSNBC hosts Alex Wagner '99 and Chris Hayes '01; New York Times, publisher A. G. Sulzberger '03, and magazine editor John F. Kennedy, Jr. '83.

Important figures in the history of education include the father of American public school education Horace Mann (1819), civil libertarian and Amherst College president Alexander Meiklejohn, first president of the University of South Carolina Jonathan Maxcy (1787), Bates College founder Oren B. Cheney (1836), University of Michigan president (1871–1909) James Burrill Angell (1849), University of California president (1899–1919) Benjamin Ide Wheeler (1875), and Morehouse College's first African-American president John Hope (1894).

Alumni in the computer sciences and industry include architect of Intel 386, 486, and Pentium microprocessors John H. Crawford '75, inventor of the first silicon transistor Gordon Kidd Teal '31, MongoDB founder Eliot Horowitz '03, Figma founder Dylan Field, and Macintosh developer Andy Hertzfeld '75.

Other notable alumni include "Lafayette of the Greek Revolution" and its historian Samuel Gridley Howe (1821) Governor of Wyoming Territory and Nebraska Governor John Milton Thayer (1841), Rhode Island Governor Augustus Bourn (1855), NASA head during first seven Apollo missions Thomas O. Paine '42, diplomat Richard Holbrooke '62, sportscaster Chris Berman '77, Houston Texans head coach Bill O'Brien '92, 2018 Miss America Cara Mund '16, Penn State football coach Joe Paterno '50, Heisman Trophy namesake John W. Heisman '91, Olympic and world champion triathlete Joanna Zeiger, royals and nobles such as Prince Rahim Aga Khan, Prince Faisal bin Al Hussein of the Hashemite Kingdom of Jordan, Princess Leila Pahlavi of Iran '92, Prince Nikolaos of Greece and Denmark, Prince Nikita Romanov, Princess Theodora of Greece and Denmark, Prince Jaime of Bourbon-Parma, Duke of San Jaime and Count of Bardi, Prince Ra'ad bin Zeid, Lady Gabriella Windsor, Prince Alexander von Fürstenberg, Countess Cosima von Bülow Pavoncelli, and her half-brother Prince Alexander-Georg von Auersperg.

Nobel Laureate alumni include humanitarian Jerry White '87 (Peace, 1997), biologist Craig Mello '82 (Physiology or Medicine, 2006), economist Guido Imbens (AM '89, PhD '91; Economic Sciences, 2021), and economist Douglas Diamond '75 (Economic Sciences, 2022).

Faculty 

Among Brown's past and present faculty are six Nobel Laureates: Lars Onsager (Chemistry, 1968), Leon Cooper (Physics, 1972), George Snell (Physiology or Medicine, 1980), George Stigler (Economic Sciences, 1982), Vernon L. Smith (Economic Sciences, 2002), and J. Michael Kosterlitz (Physics, 2016).

Notable past and present faculty include biologists Anne Fausto-Sterling (Ph.D. 1970) and Kenneth R. Miller (Sc.B. 1970); computer scientists Robert Sedgewick and Andries van Dam; economists Hyman Minsky, Glenn Loury, George Stigler, Mark Blyth, and Emily Oster; historians Gordon S. Wood and Joan Wallach Scott; mathematicians David Gale, David Mumford, Mary Cartwright, and Solomon Lefschetz; physicists Sylvester James Gates and Gerald Guralnik. Faculty in literature include Chinua Achebe, Ama Ata Aidoo, and Carlos Fuentes. Among Brown's faculty and fellows in political science, and public affairs are former prime minister of Italy and former EU chief, Romano Prodi; former president of Brazil, Fernando Cardoso; former president of Chile, Ricardo Lagos; and son of Soviet Premier Nikita Khrushchev, Sergei Khrushchev. Other faculty include philosopher Martha Nussbaum, author Ibram X. Kendi, and public health doctor Ashish Jha.

In popular culture

Brown's reputation as an institution with a free-spirited, iconoclastic student body is portrayed in fiction and popular culture. Family Guy character Brian Griffin is a Brown alumnus. The O.C.s main character Seth Cohen is denied acceptance to Brown while his girlfriend Summer Roberts is accepted. In The West Wing, Amy Gardner is a Brown alumna.

See also

List of Brown University statues
Brown University Alma Mater
Josiah S. Carberry

Explanatory notes

References

Citations

External links

Brown University Athletics - Official Athletics Website

 
Colonial architecture in Rhode Island
Colonial colleges
Educational institutions established in 1764
Georgian architecture in Rhode Island
Rhode Island in the American Revolution
Universities and colleges in Providence, Rhode Island
1764 establishments in Rhode Island
Private universities and colleges in Rhode Island
Leadership in Energy and Environmental Design basic silver certified buildings